WHUN may refer to:

 WHUN (AM), a radio station (1150 AM) licensed to serve Huntingdon, Pennsylvania, United States
 WHUN-FM, a radio station (103.5 FM) licensed to serve Huntingdon, Pennsylvania
 WDBF-FM, a radio station (106.3 FM) licensed to serve Mount Union, Pennsylvania, which held the call sign WHUN-FM from 2009 to 2015
 WJPJ, a radio station (1190 AM) licensed to serve Humboldt, Tennessee, United States, which held the call sign WHUN from 2010 to 2012